Lycidola expansa is a species of beetle in the family Cerambycidae. It was described by Henry Walter Bates in 1881. It is known from Costa Rica, Colombia, and Panama.

References

Hemilophini
Beetles described in 1881